Katherine Kelly Lang (born Katherine Kelly Wegeman; July 25, 1961) is an American actress. She is best known for playing Brooke Logan in the CBS soap opera The Bold and the Beautiful of the CBS Daytime programming block.

Personal life
Lang was born in Hollywood, California, and graduated from Beverly Hills High School. She is the daughter of Olympic ski jumper Keith R. Wegeman and actress Judith Lang and the granddaughter of Oscar-winning cinematographer Charles Lang.

Lang has been divorced twice. She is the mother of three children from her two marriages: her two sons Jeremy Skott Snider (born 1990), Julian Lang Snider (born 1992) from her then husband Skott Snider, and her daughter Zoe Katrina D'Andrea (born 1997) from her then husband Alex D'Andrea, and has a stepdaughter, Danyelle D'Andrea (born 1991).

On November 11, 2012, it was announced that Lang had filed for divorce, after 15 years of marriage citing "irreconcilable differences". The divorce was finalized in June 2014.

In May 2018, she became a grandmother with the birth of her granddaughter, Zuma, via her daughter Zoe.

Career
Lang made her acting debut in the film Skatetown, U.S.A. (1979), alongside Scott Baio, Maureen McCormick, and Patrick Swayze. That was followed by guest roles in numerous television series such as the short-lived The Powers of Matthew Star and Masquerade and the long-running Riptide, Magnum, P.I., Happy Days, The Fall Guy, and the HBO comedy series 1st & Ten. Lang starred in the 1996 television film Subliminal Seduction. In 1985, she appeared in four music videos: Alabama's "There's No Way" (where she played the love interest of Alabama lead singer Randy Owen) The Beach Boys' "Getcha Back" and its sequel "It's Gettin' Late" and The Medflys' "Compulsive" for a band from her childhood hometown, Carmel CA.

In 1987, Lang was offered the role of blue-collar Brooke Logan on the CBS soap opera The Bold and the Beautiful for the CBS Daytime programming block, and has been an integral part of the program ever since. Her love affair with Ridge Forrester (originally played by Ronn Moss, and since 2013 by Thorsten Kaye) has been a key story arc for  35 years, and a love triangle among Brooke, Ridge and Taylor (Originally played by Hunter Tylo and since December 2021 Krista Allen) stretched over more than thirty years starting with Taylor's entrance to the show in 1990. The show's 5,000th episode included only the four core characters: Brooke, Ridge, Stephanie and Eric. As of February 2015, Lang is one of only two actors to be on The Bold and the Beautiful throughout the series. The other is John McCook, who portrays Eric Forrester.

In 1999, she appeared as Brooke in The Young and the Restless, interacting with Eric Braeden (Victor), Peter Bergman (Jack), and Eileen Davidson (Ashley). Lang previously appeared on The Young and the Restless as Gretchen in 1981, and returned to the soap, for a brief stint, in July 2007. Her work as Brooke has been recognized with seven Soap Opera Digest Award nominations, beginning in 1991 and most recently in 2005.

In 2016, Lang made a special guest appearance as herself in the Australian soap opera Neighbours on 10 Peach. In January 2019, she returned to Australian television as a contestant on I'm a Celebrity...Get Me Out of Here! for season 5. In October 2019 she made a guest appearance on the Greek soap opera "8 lexeis" for SKAI TV. She played Grace Heart, a reporter who traveled from New York, to Corfu, Greece, only that was not her true identity!

Filmography

Awards and nominations

References

External links

 

1961 births
Living people
20th-century American actresses
21st-century American actresses
Actresses from Hollywood, Los Angeles
American film actresses
American soap opera actresses
American television actresses
I'm a Celebrity...Get Me Out of Here! (Australian TV series) participants